The Javan munia (Lonchura leucogastroides) is a species of estrildid finch native to southern Sumatra, Java, Bali and Lombok islands in Indonesia. It was introduced in Singapore and the Malay Peninsula; It inhabits subtropical and tropical dry shrubland and grassland habitat. It has been assessed as Least Concern on the IUCN Red List.

The Javan munia is known to feed on algae.

Origin
Origin and phylogeny has been obtained by Antonio Arnaiz-Villena et al..

References

Javan munia
Birds of Java
Birds of Bali
Birds of Lombok
Javan munia